E25 or E-25 may refer to:
 E25 fuel, see Common ethanol fuel mixtures
 European route E25, a road connecting Hook of Holland in the Netherlands and Palermo in Italy
 A German World War II tank version, see Entwicklung series#JagdpanzerE-25
 A variant of the Nissan Caravan produced from 2001-2012
 Meihan Expressway and Nishi-Meihan Expressway, route E25 in Japan
 Kuala Lumpur–Kuala Selangor Expressway, route E25 in Malaysia
 Ecuador Highway 25 or E25, Troncal de la Costa (Coastal Trunk) which goes from San Miguel de los Bancos through Guayaquil to Peru